Suphot Panich (born 20 July 1936) is a Thai former footballer who competed in the 1968 Summer Olympics.

References

External links
 

1936 births
Living people
Suphot Panich
Suphot Panich
Footballers at the 1968 Summer Olympics
Association football midfielders